2020 Florida Amendment 2 was an amendment to the Constitution of Florida that passed on November 3, 2020, via a statewide referendum concurrent with other elections. The amendment sets to increase the state's hourly minimum wage to $15 by 2026. According to Florida law, amendments to the state constitution requires 60% of the popular vote to pass.

References

Florida_ballot_measures
Florida Amendment 2
Amendment 2